Gyaraspur is a town in the Vidisha district, Madhya Pradesh, India. It is also the headquarters of a tehsil of the same name.

History 

Gyaraspur was of considerable importance in medieval India. The place has several ruins of several old Hindu, Jain and Buddhist places of worship. These include Maladevi Temple, Hindola Torna and the Bajramath Surya Temple.

Transport 
Gyaraspur is located near Vidisha (38 km) and Sanchi (48km). Udaipura, famous for its heritage temples, can be reached via Gulabganj and basoda.

Topography
Gyaraspur lies in a gorge of some low steep hills, at distance of about 38.4 km north-east from the district and Tehsil headquarters town, Vidisha.. The place is situated on the old high road to Sagar. Buses ply on the road.

Places to visit in Gyaraspur
The extensive ruins, scattered in and around the Tehsil, narrate the story of glory that was Gyaraspur in the late ancient and early medieval times. These ruins indicate that the place has passed through the influence of Buddhism, Brahmanism and Jainism.

Maladevi Temple: This temple is quite picturesquely situated on the slope of a hill overlooking the valley. Located on a huge platform cut out of the hillside and strengthened by a massive retaining wall, Maladevi temple is in fact imposing and stupendous building. It comprise an entrance-porch, a hall and a shrine surrounded by a circumambulatory passage and crowned with a lofty Shikara all covered with rich carving. Though now Jain images occupy the shrine room and hall, a figure of a goddess occupying the dedicatory block on the outer door frame and other decorative sculptures probably indicate that the temple was originally dedicated to some goddess and it was subsequently appropriated by the Jains.
Hindola Torna: It is one of the 'Toranas' or ornamental entrance arches leading to a large temple either of Vishnu or of Trimurti. Hindola means a swing, and this tarana with its two upright pillars and cross-beam has a truly connotative name. All the four sides of the two lofty pillars are carved into panels with insets of the ten incarnations of Vishnu.
Bajramath Temple: The bajramath is a fine example of a very rare class of temples with three shrines or cells placed abreast. All these shrines now occupied by Jain idols belonging to the Digambara sect. But it is clear from the sculptures placed on the door frames and niches on the basement that originally these shrines sheltered the Hindu Trinity. More precisely the central shrine was dedicated to Surya, the southern to Vishnu and the northern to Siva. The carving of the doorway is exceptionally fine and vigorous. The Shikara of the temple is unusual in its plan and design.

Gallery

References 

Villages in Vidisha district
Tourist attractions in Vidisha district